Portland Museum  may refer to:

 Portland Museum (Louisville), Louisville, Kentucky, USA
 Portland Museum, Dorset, England (on the Isle of Portland)
 Portland Museum of Art, Maine, USA
 Portland Art Museum, Oregon, USA
 Portland Children's Museum, Oregon, USA
 Portland Gallery, London, England
 'The Portland Museum', collection of Margaret Cavendish-Harley, Duchess of Portland, now dissolved